Leano Morelli (born Ileano Morelli on 1 October 1950) is an Italian singer-songwriter and musician.

Life and career 
Born in Villa Minozzo, Reggio Emilia, Morelli started composing songs at very young age. Put under contract by Phonogram Records, he got his first hit in 1976, with the song "Un amore diverso", which ranked #18 on the Italian hit parade. Between 1976 and 1981 he entered the competition at the Sanremo Music Festival four times. His hits include "Cantare gridare sentirsi tutti uguali", he presented at the 1978 Festivalbar, and "Io ti porterei", which peaked at the seventh place on the Italian hit parade. Starting from the mid-1980s he focused his activities on live performances and concerts.

Discography 
 Album   
     1977: Nata libera  
     1978: Leano Morelli 
     1979: Roma Londra Milano  
     1984: Dovevi amarmi così  
     1995: Il meglio  
     1997: Leano Morelli canta i successi dei I Nomadi e Guccini
     1998: Leano Morelli canta i successi di Fabrizio De André
     2003: Nata libera (Il meglio)
     2012: Percorsi

References

External links 
 

People from the Province of Reggio Emilia
1950 births
Italian pop singers
Italian composers
Italian male composers
Italian singer-songwriters
Living people
Italian male singers